The New Orleans Privateers men's basketball statistical leaders are individual statistical leaders of the New Orleans Privateers men's basketball program in various categories, including points, assists, blocks, rebounds, and steals. Within those areas, the lists identify single-game, single-season, and career leaders. The Privateers represent the University of New Orleans in the NCAA's Southland Conference.

New Orleans began competing in intercollegiate basketball in 1969.  The NCAA did not officially record assists as a stat until the 1983–84 season, and blocks and steals until the 1985–86 season, but New Orleans' record books includes players in these stats before these seasons. These lists are updated through the end of the 2020–21 season.

Scoring

Rebounds

Assists

Steals

Blocks

References

New Orleans
Statistical